Dracula verticulosa is a species of orchid.

verticulosa